Nora Maier Forster (born 6 November 1942) is a German publishing heiress and former actor and model who is primarily known as a music promoter.
Before moving to London in the late 1960s, she worked in Germany with Jimi Hendrix, Wishbone Ash and Yes. In London she helped financially support the punk bands The Slits, the Sex Pistols and The Clash. She is married to John Lydon of the Sex Pistols.

Early life
Nora Maier Forster was born 6 November 1942 in Munich, Germany to a wealthy publishing family. Her father, was the editorial manager of the magazine Der Spiegel, and ran the newspaper, Der Tagesspiegel. She was educated in Munich, and was interested in music from an early age. After she finished school, she went to work for her father's media company.

She is a publishing heiress of Der Spiegel. After the death of her father she inherited $120 million from his fortune.

Career

Forster began her work as a music promoter in Munich. Her home there became a meeting place for "rock royalty". Some of the acts she worked with in Germany were Jimi Hendrix, Wishbone Ash and Yes. She found German society to be too restricting, and decided to move to London with her daughter in the latter half of the 1960s. Their first flat was located in a "cold, damp and dark" basement in West London, near the Chelsea football ground. Following that they moved to a small house off Gowrie Road in South London. During this time she came to be called a "Punk Mummy Warrior" who guided her daughter, Ari Up's musical pursuits and supported the development of her band, The Slits, when Ari was just fourteen or fifteen. Forster hosted numerous musician house guests, and among them was Neneh Cherry, the teenage step-daughter of Don Cherry. Cherry performed backing vocal with The Slits for a time.

During the 1960s and 70s, Forster was part of the bohemian scene in London. Starting in the late 1960s Forster's home in Shepherd's Bush became a crash pad, salon, and meeting place for rock musicians including Joe Strummer of The Clash, Jimi Hendrix, Jon Anderson of the band Yes, and many other bands. She helped to financially support the punk bands The Slits, the Sex Pistols and The Clash.

In 1970, Forster began to promote music gatherings in London. In 1975, Forster met John Lydon of the Sex Pistols in west London at Vivienne Westwood's clothing store, Sex, on Kings Road. In 1979, she married Lydon who is 14 years her junior.  They married in Düsseldorf. Previously, she was the girlfriend of Chris Spedding, a well known musician and rock music producer. In 1986, she was a major stockholder of Der Tagesspiegel, a West Berlin-based newspaper. Forster and Lydon moved to California in the 1980s.

Personal life

In 1988 Forster and Lydon were booked to travel on the December 21 Pan Am Flight 103 that was bombed over Lockerbie, but missed taking the deadly flight due to packing delays.

In 2000, Forster and Lydon became guardians of Up's twin sons, Pablo and Pedro. Forster and Lydon later became the guardians of Up's third child, Wilton. Up died in 2010 at age 48 from breast cancer.

Forster was diagnosed with Alzheimer's disease in 2018. She currently lives in Venice Beach, Los Angeles, US with Lydon who is her full-time care taker when he is not on tour.

References

External links

Music promoters
20th-century English actors
20th-century English actresses
English models
Women music promoters
German emigrants to England
German emigrants to the United States
Actresses from Munich
1942 births
Der Spiegel people
People with Alzheimer's disease
Living people